Sophie Errante (born 22 July 1971) is a French politician of La République En Marche! (LREM) who has been serving as a member of the French National Assembly since the 2012 elections, representing the department of Loire-Atlantique, first as a socialist, and then from the 2017 elections, as an LREM member.

Political career
In 2012, Errante was the successful socialist candidate for Loire-Atlantique's 10th constituency.  For the 2017 election, she moved to LREM.

Following the 2017 legislative election, Errante stood as a candidate for the National Assembly's presidency; in an internal vote within the LREM parliamentary group, she lost against François de Rugy.

In parliament, Errante serves on the Finance Committee. In addition to her committee assignments, she is a member of the French delegation to the Inter-Parliamentary Union (IPU). Since 2018, she has also been representing the parliament on the supervisory board of the Deposits and Consignments Fund (CDC).

Since November 2017, Cicurel has been part of LREM´s executive board under the leadership of the party's successive chairmen Christophe Castaner and Stanislas Guerini.

Following the 2022 legislative election, Errante stood again as a candidate for the National Assembly's presidency; in an internal vote, she lost against Yaël Braun-Pivet.

Political positions
In July 2019, Errante voted in favor of the French ratification of the European Union’s Comprehensive Economic and Trade Agreement (CETA) with Canada.

See also
 2017 French legislative election

References

1971 births
Living people
Deputies of the 14th National Assembly of the French Fifth Republic
Deputies of the 15th National Assembly of the French Fifth Republic
La République En Marche! politicians
21st-century French women politicians
Politicians from Nantes
Women members of the National Assembly (France)
Socialist Party (France) politicians
Deputies of the 16th National Assembly of the French Fifth Republic
Members of Parliament for Loire-Atlantique